Croix D'or et Poste is the oldest hotel in Münster, Switzerland, the former aristocratic family residence founded in 1620.

The hotel includes restaurant and a wine cellar with well-known Valais wines.

See also 
List of oldest companies

References

External links 
Homepage
Location on Google Maps.

Hotels in Switzerland
Restaurants in Switzerland
Companies established in the 17th century
17th-century establishments in Switzerland
Hotels established in the 17th century